Reuben W. Peterson (November 22, 1899 – April 1, 1979) was a member of the Wisconsin State Assembly. He was a Republican.

Biography
Peterson was born on November 22, 1899 in Berlin, Wisconsin to Nels and Martha Peterson. During World War I, he served with the United States Navy.

Political career
Peterson was a member of the Assembly from 1935 until his resignation in 1939. In 1927, he was District Attorney of Green Lake County, Wisconsin. Additionally, he was a delegate to the 1936 Republican National Convention.

References

External links

The Political Graveyard

People from Berlin, Wisconsin
Republican Party members of the Wisconsin State Assembly
District attorneys in Wisconsin
Military personnel from Wisconsin
United States Navy personnel of World War I
1899 births
1979 deaths
20th-century American politicians